Lloyd's sign is a sign of renal calculus or pyelonephritis when pain is elicited by deep percussion in the back between the 12th rib and the spine. It is closely related to costovertebral angle tenderness in that the area of percussion is the same. However, Lloyd's sign is defined as positive costovertebral angle tenderness along with the absence of tenderness with normal pressure.

References

Nephrology
Abdominal pain